Tonelli is a 1943 German drama film directed by Victor Tourjansky and starring Ferdinand Marian, Winnie Markus and Mady Rahl.

The film's sets were designed by the art director Ludwig Reiber. It was shot at the Bavaria Studios in Munich and at the Deutsches Theater in the city.

Cast

References

Bibliography 
 Hans-Michael Bock and Tim Bergfelder. The Concise Cinegraph: An Encyclopedia of German Cinema. Berghahn Books, 2009.

External links 
 

1943 films
1943 comedy-drama films
German comedy-drama films
Films of Nazi Germany
1940s German-language films
Films directed by Victor Tourjansky
Circus films
Bavaria Film films
Films shot at Bavaria Studios
German black-and-white films
1940s German films